Hypolycaena danis, the black and white tit or orchid flash, is a butterfly of the family Lycaenidae. It is found in the Maluku Province in Indonesia  as well as the New Guinea  region and north-eastern Australia.

The wingspan is about 30 mm. Adults have white wings with broad black margins. The hindwings have blue edges with black spots and two tails. The underside of the wings is similar, but the pale areas are yellowish.

The larvae feed on Vanda species and Dendrobium bigibbum, Dendrobium canaliculatum, Cattleya, Renanthera, Phalaenopsis and Phalaenanthe species. They are off white to reddish green, sometimes with red bands.

Pupation takes place in an off-white pupa, which is attached to the stem of the host plant.

Subspecies
H. d. danis (Bachan, Halmahera, Morotai)
H. d. danisoides de Nicéville, 1897 (Kai Islands)
H. d. deripha Hewitson, 1878 (Aru, New Guinea, Louisade Archipelago)
H. d. milo Grose-Smith (New Britain)
H. d. turneri (Waterhouse, 1903) (Cape York to Cairns)

Gallery

References

Butterflies described in 1865
Hypolycaenini
Butterflies of Asia
Butterflies of Oceania
Taxa named by Baron Cajetan von Felder
Taxa named by Rudolf Felder